The Headquarters of the Supreme High Command was an extraordinary body of the highest military command, exercising strategic leadership of the Soviet Armed Forces during the Great Patriotic War.

History
On June 23, 1941, the Main Military Council of the Red Army was abolished. On the same day, by the resolution of the Council of People's Commissars of the Soviet Union and the Central Committee of the All–Union Communist Party (Bolsheviks) No. 825, the Headquarters of the Main Command of the Armed Forces of the Soviet Union was established. It included: Semyon Timoshenko (Chairman), Georgy Zhukov, Joseph Stalin, Vyacheslav Molotov, Kliment Voroshilov, Semyon Budyonny, Nikolai Kuznetsov.

On July 10, 1941, by a decree of the State Defense Committee, in connection with the formation of the High Commands of the Troops of the Directions (North–West, West and South–West), it was transformed into the Headquarters of the High Command, Joseph Stalin became the chairman, and Boris Shaposhnikov was introduced to it.

On July 10, 1941, it was renamed into the Headquarters of the Supreme High Command.

On February 17, 1945, by a resolution of the State Defense Committee, the following composition of the Headquarters of the Supreme High Command was determined: Joseph Stalin (Supreme Commander–in–Chief), Georgy Zhukov (Deputy People's Commissar of Defense of the Soviet Union), Alexander Vasilevsky (Deputy People's Commissar of Defense), Alexey Antonov, Nikolai Bulganin, Nikolai Kuznetsov.

The Headquarters of the Supreme High Command carried out its activities under the leadership of the State Defense Committee.

Throughout the entire war, the Headquarters of the Supreme High Command did not leave Moscow. The members of the Headquarters gathered in Stalin's Kremlin office, but with the start of the bombing of Moscow, it moved from the Kremlin to a small mansion at Kirov Street, 37, with reliable offices and communications. During the bombing, the work moved to the Kirovskaya Metro Station, where an underground strategic center for the management of the Armed Forces was prepared.

In October 1945, the Headquarters of the Supreme Command was abolished.

Composition

Formations
Central Headquarters of the Partisan Movement at the Headquarters of the Supreme High Command;
Rocket Artillery Formations, from September 8, 1941, to April 24, 1943;
Long–Range Aviation of the Soviet Union;
Guards Armies.

Famous Orders of the Headquarters of the Supreme High Command
Order of the Headquarters of the Supreme High Command No. 270 of August 16, 1941 "On the Responsibility of Servicemen for Surrendering and Leaving Weapons to the Enemy";
Order of the Headquarters of the Supreme High Command No. 428 of November 17, 1941 "Destroy and Burn to the Ground All the Settlements in the Rear of the German Troops".

Addresses
Stalin's office in the Kremlin;
First days of the war and until the end of 1941 – Kirov Street, 37 (the former estate of Dokuchaev–Soldatenkov, later there was the reception of the Minister of Defense of the Soviet Union, later the reception of the Minister of Defense of Russia);
Since 1942 – the Kremlin.

Notes

Documents
"On the Establishment of the Headquarters of the Main Command of the Armed Forces of the Soviet Union"
"On the Transformation of the Headquarters of the Main Command and the Creation of the Main Commands of the North–West, West and South–West Directions"

See also
Supreme Commander–in–Chief
Reserve of the Supreme High Command
Headquarters of the Supreme Commander–in–Chief (World War I)
Order No. 270
Order No. 227

References

Sources
Alexander Vasilevsky. Life's Work. 4th Edition. Moscow, Publishing House of Political Literature of the Central Committee of the Communist Party of the Soviet Union, 1983
Team of Authors. The Great Patriotic War (1941–1945): Dictionary–Reference Book / Edited by Mikhail Kiryan – 2nd Edition – Moscow: Publishing House of Political Literature of the Central Committee of the Communist Party of the Soviet Union, 1988 – 
Military Encyclopedic Dictionary. Moscow, Military Publishing House, 1984
Yuri Gorkov. Joseph Stalin and the Headquarters of the Supreme High Command // Military History Journal – 1995 – No. 3 – Pages 20–25
Yuri Gorkov. On the History of the Creation of the State Defense Committee and the Headquarters of the Supreme High Command. Based on New Archival Materials // "New and Contemporary History" – 1999 – No. 4 – Pages 17–34
Yuri Gorkov. Kremlin. Headquarters. General Base – Tver: RIF LTD, 1995 – 384 Pages

External links

Great Soviet Encyclopedia

Eastern Front (World War II)
Military of the Soviet Union
Military units and formations of the Soviet Union in World War II
Military history of Russia
Command and control